Guy Gallopin (born 23 January 1956) is a French former professional racing cyclist. He rode in five editions of the Tour de France and three editions of the Vuelta a España. His brothers Alain and Joël and his nephew Tony were also professional cyclists.

Major results
1981
 1st Paris–Camembert
1984
 1st Stage 2 Critérium du Dauphiné Libéré
 4th Bordeaux–Paris
1985
 1st Stage 2 Tour du Vaucluse
 3rd Bordeaux–Paris
 4th Overall Tour du Limousin
 10th GP Ouest–France
1986
 2nd Bordeaux–Paris
 3rd Châteauroux Classic
1987
 3rd Bordeaux–Paris

References

External links
 

1956 births
Living people
French male cyclists
Sportspeople from Eure-et-Loir
Cyclists from Centre-Val de Loire
21st-century French people
20th-century French people